Finn Tugwell (born 18 March 1976) is a Danish table tennis player who currently plays for Roskilde BTK. He paired up with Danish Michael Maze in doubles, with whom he won the bronze medal at the 2004 Summer Olympics, beating the Russian pair Dmitry Mazunov/Alexey Smirnov.

His highest world ranking was 65th in October 2004.

References

1976 births
Living people
Danish male table tennis players
Olympic table tennis players of Denmark
Olympic bronze medalists for Denmark
Table tennis players at the 2000 Summer Olympics
Table tennis players at the 2004 Summer Olympics
Olympic medalists in table tennis
Medalists at the 2004 Summer Olympics
Sportspeople from Aarhus
21st-century Danish people